Ban Khamin (lit: "Village of Turmeric") is a road junction and historic neighborhood in the Siri Rat Subdistrict, Bangkok Noi District in Thon Buri side, Bangkok. It's the three-way of Arun Ammarin Road and Soi Itsaraphap 44 (Saeng Sueksa).

History & characteristics
The name "Ban Khamin" after this area in the Thon Buri period (1767–82) before the rise of Rattanakosin Kingdom (1782–present). It's a community of professionals who make turmeric powder (ban in Thai means "house, village" and khamin means "turmeric"). It's an important ingredient in traditional Thai medicine. Currently, the turmeric powder industry has been lost. There's only one shop in the Phran Nok Intersection which nearby, but named "Ban Khamin" is still in use today. Apart from the junction, there're also Khlong Ban Khamin (คลองบ้านขมิ้น; Ban Khamin Canal), a small waterway with a length of only  near Siriraj Hospital and San Chaopho Ban Khamin Pung Thao Kong (ศาลเจ้าพ่อบ้านขมิ้น (ปึงท้าวกง)), a small Teochew  joss house  built on the reign of Emperor Guangxu of the Qing dynasty, located near the junction.

In the past, after World War II ended shortly, there was a cinema named Ban Khamin Theater located in the local market area. Even if it's only a second class cinema. But it's very popular with locals, because at that time Thonburi side is still rural. It came to an end when it was totally burned down on the late in the morning of Sunday August 16th, 1970. The entire wooden building burned down. One of the dead was a 4-year-old boy who fled to hide in a jar. At present, the location of the cinema and market becomes a vet clinic and parking lot.

From Ban Khamin in Soi Itsaraphap 44, there's also a roadway (turn right) toward Ban Chang Lo (บ้านช่างหล่อ) in the area of  Ban Chang Lo Subdistrict. It's one of the oldest communities in Thonburi, people in the community have a career casting the Buddha statue. And another roadway (turn left) to the Soi Matum (ซอยมะตูม; Matum Alley) or Trok Matum (ตรอกมะตูม; Matum Lane) in the Soi Arun Ammarin 23. People in this area have a business produced and selling sweet bael preserves (matum in Thai means "bael"). Originally named here "Ban Plueak Som O" (บ้านเปลือกส้มโอ; "House of Pomelo Peel") was later changed "Soi Suan Anan" (ซอยสวนอนันต์) and Soi Matum as the current.

Nearby places

Wat Rakhangkhositaram
Siriraj Hospital 
Wang Lang Market
Wat Phraya Tham Worawihan
Thonburi Hospital
Navy Park Club

Transportation 
 BMTA bus: route 57, 208

See also
Ban Noen

References 

Neighbourhoods of Bangkok
Bangkok Noi district
Road junctions in Bangkok